The People's Republic of Bangladesh has a growing number of diplomatic and consular missions around the world with some countries having more than one Bangladesh High Commission or Bangladesh Embassy or Consulate General. As a member of the Commonwealth of Nations, Bangladeshi diplomatic missions in the capital cities of fellow Commonwealth countries are known as High Commissions instead of Embassies. In some cities of Commonwealth countries, Bangladeshi consular missions are called "Assistant High Commissions" or "Deputy High Commissions".

, Bangladesh has over 82 missions around the world, with 59 being Embassies or High Commissions; 20 being Consulates General, Consulates, Deputy High Commissions, or Assistant High Commissions; and two Permanent Missions to the United Nations in New York City and Geneva.

History 
The first diplomatic mission of modern Bangladesh was founded in Kolkata on 18 April 1971 after M Hossain Ali, the deputy high commissioner of Pakistan, and the other ethnic Bengali staff at the mission defected to the Bangladeshi provisional government amidst a spate of similar defections around the world during the Bangladesh Liberation War. Although it was not officially recognized by India at the time, it was allowed to function under Bangladeshi control. Another mission in New Delhi was opened ten days later with the knowledge of the Indian Ministry of External Affairs. Later that year, offices similar to trade missions were opened in countries such as the Soviet Union, Czechoslovakia, and Romania to represent Bangladesh until the country gained diplomatic recognition.

In recent years, the Awami League-led government has decided to expand the country's diplomatic network to increase international trade and better serve Bangladeshis abroad, with plans to open over twenty new missions by the end of 2021 and add over thirty diplomatic missions by 2024.

Current missions

Africa

Americas

Asia

Europe

Oceania

Multilateral organisations

Gallery

Closed missions

Africa

Europe

See also 
 Foreign relations of Bangladesh
 List of diplomatic missions in Bangladesh
 Visa policy of Bangladesh

Notes

References

External links
 Ministry of Foreign Affairs of Bangladesh (official site)

 
Bangladesh
Missions